Chrisjan Vorster (born 17 August 1976) is a South African cricketer. He played in fourteen first-class and fifteen List A matches from 1996/97 to 1999/00.

References

External links
 

1976 births
Living people
South African cricketers
Boland cricketers
Free State cricketers
Cricketers from Paarl